Duke Christian Louis of Mecklenburg (29 September 191218 July 1996) was the second son of the last reigning Grand Duke of Mecklenburg-Schwerin, Frederick Francis IV.

Early life

He was born in Ludwigslust as the second child of the reigning Grand Duke of Mecklenburg-Schwerin, Frederick Francis IV, and his wife Princess Alexandra of Hanover, a daughter of Ernest Augustus, Crown Prince of Hanover and Princess Thyra of Denmark. Following the defeat of the German Empire in World War I, his father abdicated on 14 November 1918.

After the abolition of the monarchy, in 1919 the family went at the invitation of Queen Alexandrine, consort of Christian X of Denmark and sister of the Grand Duke, into exile in Denmark, where they lived for a year in Sorgenfri Palace. Later, the family returned to Mecklenburg and lived in Gelbensande, and from 1921 the family settled at Ludwigslust Castle. After finishing school, in the autumn of 1935, he went as a recruit in the cavalry regiment 14 in Ludwigslust, with whom he was drafted in 1939 into World War II. In 1944, he was dismissed because of a decree as being a member of a former ruling house of the armed forces.

After the war
When the war ended, Ludwigslust was first occupied by the British, but soon was transferred to the Soviet occupation, so that Christian Louis initially went with his family to Glücksburg Castle in Schleswig-Holstein. But he soon returned to Ludwigslust to take care of the family property and was taken prisoner by the Soviet military authorities. After imprisonment he was flown to Moscow, where he was sentenced in the Lubyanka prison to be imprisoned for 25 years.

In 1953, he was released after the intervention of Konrad Adenauer for German POWs in the Soviet Union and came back to Christmas 1953 with his family in Glücksburg.

Marriage and family
On 5 July 1954 in Glücksburg, Christian Louis married in a civil wedding Princess Barbara of Prussia, daughter of Prince Sigismund of Prussia and Princess Charlotte of Saxe-Altenburg. They married in a religious ceremony on 11 July 1954. They had two daughters:

Duchess Donata of Mecklenburg (b. 11 March 1956), married Alexander von Solodkoff and had issue.
Duchess Edwina of Mecklenburg (b. 25 September 1960), married Konrad von Posern and had issue.

Ancestry

Notes

Sources
Alexander Solodkoff: Christian Ludwig Herzog zu Mecklenburg: Mecklenburg-Schwerin, Club Wien 2003, 
 Alison Weir: Britain's Royal Family: A Complete Genealogy, The Bodley Head, London 1999, S: 292
 Marlene A. Eilers: Queen Victoria's Descendants, Genealogical Publishing Co., Baltimore 1987, S. 161, 162, 169
Peter Hoffmann: Stauffenbergs Freund - Die tragische Geschichte des Widerstandskämpfers Joachim Kuhn, Verlag C.H.Beck München 2007, 
 Peter Hoffmann: Oberst i.G. Henning von Tresckow und die Staatsstreichspläne im Jahr 1943, in: Vierteljahrshefte für Zeitgeschichte, Vol 55, 2, April 2007, S. 331-364
Christian Ludwig von Mecklenburg: Erzählungen aus meinem Leben, Schwerin, 3. Auflage31998, 

1912 births
1996 deaths
House of Mecklenburg-Schwerin
People from Ludwigslust
Sons of monarchs
German Army officers of World War II